The 2014 German Indoor Athletics Championships was the 61st edition of the national championship in indoor track and field for Germany. It was held on 22–23 February at the Arena Leipzig in Leipzig. A total of 26 events, 13 for men and 13 for women, were contested plus five further events were held separately. It was to serve as preparation for the 2014 IAAF World Indoor Championships. A sell-out crowd of 7,500 spectators attended the competition.

The combined events and racewalking national championships were held on 1–2 February at the Leichtathletikhalle Frankfurt-Kalbach in Kalbach-Riedberg. The 3 × 800 m and 3 × 1000 m relays were held on 16 February alongside the  German Indoor Youth Athletics Championships in Sindelfingen.

Results

Men

Women

References

Results
Overall Results. German Athletics Federation. Retrieved 2021-04-06.

German Indoor Athletics Championships
German Indoor Athletics Championships
German Indoor Athletics Championships
German Indoor Athletics Championships
Sports competitions in Leipzig